Allyson "Ally" Nicole Carda (born January 15, 1993) is an American, former collegiate All-American softball pitcher and first baseman. Carda has been a member of the United States women's national softball team since 2015 and was a member of the UCLA Bruins from 2012 to 2015, earning three First Team All-Pac-12 and back-to-back conference Player of the Year awards. She also earned back-to-back National Fastpitch Coaches Association First Team All-American honors. Carda represented Team USA at the 2020 Summer Olympics and won a silver medal.

Early life
Carda was born on January 15, 1993, in Sacramento, California, to parents Heather and Jim Carda.  Carda and her family moved to Elk Grove, California, where she attended Pleasant Grove High School, from where she graduated in 2011. She is openly lesbian and her partner is Kelly Kretschman.

UCLA Bruins
Carda signed a letter of intent to play for UCLA during her senior year of High School.  Carda became one of the all-time greats in the winningest program in history, becoming the best 2 way player for the Bruins since Lisa Fernandez.

International career
Carda was named to the United States women's national softball team roster in 2015.  Carda also played for the Red, White, and Blue in 2016 and 2017.  Carda helped the Red, White, and Blue to a World Cup of Softball Gold Medal in 2015, and a Silver in 2016.  Carda also won a silver medal at the 2015 Pan American Games and a gold medal at the 2016 Women's Softball World Championship. Carda represented Team USA at the 2020 Summer Olympics and won a silver medal. At the Tokyo Games, Carda suffered the loss in the gold medal game to Team Japan in two innings of work on July 27, 2021. For the tournament, Carda pitched eight innings and scored a run for Team USA.

Statistics

References

External links

1993 births
Living people
Pan American Games medalists in softball
Pan American Games silver medalists for the United States
Softball players at the 2015 Pan American Games
UCLA Bruins softball players
Chicago Bandits players
Competitors at the 2022 World Games
World Games gold medalists
World Games medalists in softball
Olympic softball players of the United States
People from Elk Grove, California
Sportspeople from Sacramento, California
Softball players from California
Medalists at the 2015 Pan American Games
Softball players at the 2020 Summer Olympics
Medalists at the 2020 Summer Olympics
Olympic silver medalists for the United States in softball
Olympic medalists in softball
LGBT baseball players
LGBT softball players
21st-century American LGBT people
21st-century American women
Lesbianism
Lesbian sportswomen